is a private junior college in Edogawa, Tokyo, Japan. The precursor of the school was founded in 1938, and it was chartered as a university in 1962.

Access
The campus is a quick 3-minute walk from Keisei Koiwa Station on the Keisei Main Line, about a 10-minute walk from Koiwa Station on the JR Sōbu Main Line, or about a 13-minute walk from Shin-Shibamata Station on the Hokusō Line.

External links 
 Official website 

Private universities and colleges in Japan
Educational institutions established in 1938
Japanese junior colleges
Universities and colleges in Tokyo
1938 establishments in Japan